is a Japanese author. He received the Akutagawa Prize for one of his novels, in 1966 at the age of 23, becoming the third of an often touted group of college seniors to win the prize at age 23, following Ishihara Shintaro and Oe Kenzaburo.

See also
Japanese literature

External links 
 http://www.yellowslicker.com/oldweb/thesis.html
 http://www.yellowslicker.com/oldweb/maruyama.html

1943 births
Japanese writers
Akutagawa Prize winners
Living people